The Black Book is a 1929 American silent film serial directed by Spencer Gordon Bennet and Thomas Storey, starring Allene Ray and Walter Miller.

Cast
 Allene Ray as Dora Drake
 Walter Miller as Ted Bradley
 Frank Lackteen as Valdez
 Paul Panzer as The Hawk
 Marie Mosquini as Sally
 Edith London as Mrs. Valdez
 Willie Fung as Tin Lung
 Edward Cecil as Limpy Lambert
 John Webb Dillion as LeBec
 Fred Malatesta as Sudro
 Floyd Adams as Michael
 Olga Vanna as The Maid
 Jock Fraser as Crook
 Evan Pearson as Crook
 Clay De Roy as Crook

See also
 List of film serials
 List of film serials by studio

References

External links

1929 films
American silent serial films
American black-and-white films
Pathé Exchange film serials
Films directed by Spencer Gordon Bennet
1929 drama films
Silent American drama films
1920s American films